Penaforte is the southernmost municipality in the Brazilian state of Ceará, bordering the state of Pernambuco.

References 

Municipalities in Ceará